House of the Damned is a 1963 horror thriller film, shot in CinemaScope. It was produced and directed by Maury Dexter, and stars Ron Foster, Merry Anders, Richard Crane, Erika Peters and Richard Kiel.

Plot
Architect Scott Campbell (Ron Foster) and his wife (Merry Anders) survey an old mansion where the previous tenant disappeared. Strange noises, eerie sights and vanishing keys ruin their attempt at a wedding anniversary. Things get worse after Scott's employer (Richard Crane) and his wife arrive, and his employer's wife is kidnapped.

Cast
 Ron Foster as Scott Campbell (credited as Ronald Foster)
 Merry Anders as Nancy Campbell
 Richard Crane as Joseph Schiller
 Erika Peters as Loy Schiller
 Dal McKennon  as Mr. Quinby
 Georgia Schmidt   as Priscilla Rochester
 Stacey Winters   as Nurse
 Richard Kiel as The Giant
 Ayllene Gibbons  as The Fat Woman
 John Gilmore  as The Legless Man
 Frieda Pushnik  as The Legless Girl

Production
Harry Spalding said he was inspired to write the film by the movie Freaks and wondering what happened to the sort of characters who used to work in freak shows in circuses.

Exteriors are filmed at the former Bugsy Siegel Mansion (later owned by Madonna) in the Hollywood Hills overlooking Lake Hollywood reservoir.
 
The movie was shot over seven days.

Release

Home media
The film was released on DVD by 20th Century Fox on September 5, 2006. The company would release the film again in 2010 as a part of its 4-disk 75th Anniversary Studio Classics collection. It was later released by Fox on June 27, 2017.

Reception

House of the Damned has received mixed reviews from critics. Author and film critic Leonard Maltin awarded the film two out of four stars, calling it "Modestly suspenseful" but criticized the film's ending as being "surprisingly wistful".
Brett Gallman from Oh, the Horror! gave the film a mixed review, commending the film's moody cinematography, atmosphere, and occasional chills generated by the title house's tenants, but criticized the film's underwhelming revelation, and "failure to deliver on its intrigue".
Craig Butler from AllMovie called the film "dull", criticizing the film's cheapness, script and cardboard characters, while also complimenting Nickolaus' cinematography as "above-average"

References

External links
 
 
 
 

1963 films
1963 horror films
1960s horror thriller films
CinemaScope films
American horror thriller films
American black-and-white films
American monster movies
Films set in country houses
1960s monster movies
1960s science fiction horror films
1960s English-language films
Films directed by Maury Dexter
1960s American films